James Cook University’s College of Business, Law and Governance delivers a range of future-focused business and law courses across Cairns, Singapore, Townsville and Brisbane*. Under the leadership of the Dean, Professor Stephen Boyle, the College promotes, fosters, and delivers quality teaching and research with both a local and global reach.

*Brisbane campus is operated by Russo Higher Education.

Business
The James Cook University College of Business, Law and Governance offers a range of undergraduate and postgraduate courses, designed to facilitate lifestyle and work commitments, whether it be studying online or on campus, or on a full or part time basis. Courses include Commerce, Accounting, Finance, Economics, Management, Marketing, Tourism and Hospitality, Law, Business Administration and Conflict Management and Resolution. A number of College of Business, Law and Governance courses are recognised nationally by accreditation bodies and professional organisations, including CPA and CA ANZ.

History 
Formed in 2014, a primary emphasis of the College is on developing leaders who are equipped with an understanding of the complexities of doing business and undertaking professional practices as are directly relevant to the ever-evolving Asia Pacific region.

Business schools in Australia
James Cook University
2000 establishments in Australia